Turkey Creek is a  long 1st order tributary to Stewarts Creek in Carroll County, Virginia.

Course 
Turkey Creek rises about 0.5 miles south of Pipers Gap in Carroll County and then flows generally south to join Stewarts Creek about 0.25 miles west of Lambsburg, Virginia.

Watershed 
Turkey Creek drains  of area, receives about 53.4 in/year of precipitation, has a wetness index of 266.95, and is about 87% forested.

See also 
 List of Rivers of Virginia

References 

Rivers of Carroll County, Virginia
Rivers of Virginia